Flotetuzumab (INN; development code MGD006) is a bispecific antibody designed for the treatment of acute myeloid leukemia.

This drug is being developed by MacroGenics, Inc.

References 

Monoclonal antibodies